Gerardo Mauricio Chavez Montaño, also Mauricio Chavez, (born 1980) is the President of the Bomberos de Mexicali basketball team of the CIBACOPA Pacific Circuit of Mexican Basketball.

Early years
Mauricio was born and raised among the border region of San Diego–Tijuana. He earned a Bachelor's degree in International Relations at Boston University. He also received a Master's degree in Regional Development from Colegio de la Frontera Norte, specializing in border relations between Mexico and the United States, and earned a Graduate Certificate in Women's Studies at the University of Cincinnati, (2006).

Bomberos de Mexicali and Zonkeys de Tijuana
In 2009, Mauricio was recruited to launch both the Bomberos de Mexicali and Zonkeys de Tijuana basketball franchises of the CIBACOPA circuit. The first campaign in 2010 brought positive results to the teams' first season, with winning streaks and play-off bids by both of the franchises. The Easter Day earthquake of 2010 that hit Baja California inevitably affected team development, as both franchises were forced to play additional away games, and in the process, sacrifice crucial home games. Preparing for the 2011 Season, the teams have found a winning solid base and will seek the CIBACOPA 2011 Championship from February to July 2011.

See also
 List of Boston University people
 Tijuana

References

External links
 
 

Boston University College of Arts and Sciences alumni
Living people
1980 births